Henning Municipal Airport  is a city-owned public-use airport located one mile south of the central business district of Henning, a city in Otter Tail County, Minnesota, United States.

Facilities and aircraft 
Henning Municipal Airport covers an area of 34 acres which contains one runway designated 17/35 with a  turf surface. For the 12-month period ending April 5, 2012, the airport had 2,000 aircraft operations, an average of 38 per week: 100% general aviation. In September 2016, there were 11 aircraft based at this airport: 10 single-engine and 1 helicopter.

References

External links 
 

Airports in Minnesota
Buildings and structures in Otter Tail County, Minnesota
Transportation in Otter Tail County, Minnesota